The following is a list of football stadiums in Ecuador, ordered by capacity. The largest stadium in Ecuador which is not used for football is the 15,000-capacity Plaza de toros de Quito.

See also

List of South American stadiums by capacity
List of association football stadiums by capacity

References

 
Ecuador
Football stadiums
Football stadiums